David White (1785 – October 19, 1834) was a U.S. Representative from Kentucky.

Born in 1785, White completed preparatory studies.
He studied law.
He was admitted to the bar and commenced practice in New Castle, Kentucky.
He served as member of the State house of representatives in 1826.

White was elected as an Adams Clay Republican to the Eighteenth Congress (March 4, 1823 – March 3, 1825).
He died in Franklin County, Kentucky, October 19, 1834.

References

1785 births
1834 deaths
Year of birth unknown
Democratic-Republican Party members of the United States House of Representatives from Kentucky
Members of the Kentucky House of Representatives
People from New Castle, Kentucky